H10 is an important Ukraine national highway (H-highway) in Lviv, Ivano-Frankivsk, and Chernivtsi Oblasts.

History
H10 belonged to the Kingdom of Galicia and Lodomeria until 1918 and was known as the Beskydy Reichsstraße. In 1817, it was built as the second east-west connection leading from Bielsko-Biała to Chernivtsi and was initially referred to as the Carpathian Road. In 1893, there were 21 toll booths on the 260-kilometer stretch between Stryi and Chernivtsi.

The stretch from Stryi to Stanislaviv (former name of Ivano-Frankivsk) belonged to the territory of the Second Polish Republic between 1918 and 1939 and was declared a state road (droga państwowa) by the Polish Roads Act of 10 December 1920.

See also

 Roads in Ukraine
 Ukraine State Highways

References 

Roads in Chernivtsi Oblast
Roads in Ivano-Frankivsk Oblast
Roads in Lviv Oblast